Figure skating at the 1995 European Youth Olympic Winter Days were held in Andorra, Andorra between February 5 and 9, 1995. Skaters competed in the disciplines of men's singles, ladies' singles, and ice dancing.

Results

Men

Ladies

European Youth Olympic Festival
Figure skating in Andorra